Wrestling at the 1995 Military World Games was held in Rome, Italy from 10 to 14 September 1995.

Medal summary

Men's freestyle

Men's Greco-Roman

Medal table

References

Medalists
1st Military World Games 1995 Results

External links
UWW Database

Wrestling
1995
Military World Games